Nicolas Achten (born 25 September 1985, in Brussels) is a Belgian conductor, singer, lutenist, and harpist mainly working in historically informed performance.

Achten is a visiting professor at the University of East Anglia and at the Flanders Operastudio.

External links

References

Belgian musicians
1985 births
Living people
Musicians from Brussels
Belgian conductors (music)
Belgian male musicians
Male conductors (music)
21st-century Belgian musicians
21st-century conductors (music)
21st-century male musicians
Academics of the University of East Anglia